Tongareva Airport is an airport on Penrhyn Island in the Cook Islands.

History
During World War II, Tongareva was of strategic importance. In 1942, 1,000 U.S. servicemen began constructing a 10,000 ft airstrip on the motu of Moananui. The airstrip was used by the American military until 1946. The island was not directly attacked, but was used for transport of men and materials.

Airlines and destinations

No scheduled flight as of May 2019; however, Air Rarotonga operates regular charter flights to the island from Rarotonga using Embraer Bandeirante and Cessna Citation II aircraft as well as occasional charters to Kiritimati in Kiribati.

References

External links

Images of Airport and Island on Air Rarotonga Web Site
Airport entry on Cook Islands Airports Web Site

Airports in the Cook Islands
Penrhyn atoll